The London ePrix is an annual race of the single-seater, electrically powered Formula E championship, held in London, United Kingdom. It was first raced in the 2014–15 season until the 2015–16 season. The event was originally meant to return for the 2019–20 season at a new location around (and through) ExCeL London before being cancelled due to the COVID-19 pandemic. The event at the new location was eventually held in the following season.

Battersea Park Circuit

The first two editions of the London ePrix took place at the Battersea Park Street Circuit, a temporary street circuit at Battersea Park in London, England. The track was designed by Formula E's London event team and British architect Simon Gibbons.

Royal Victoria Dock/ExCeL

For the 2019–20 season, the London ePrix was scheduled to be held around and through the ExCeL London and around the Royal Victoria Dock. The  layout, featuring 23 turns, became Formula E's first "indoor/outdoor" track.

However, the calendar was adjusted due to the COVID-19 pandemic before being cancelled. The London ePrix finally returned in the 2020–21 season, this time as a double header.

Ahead of the 2022 Sabic London E-Prix the double hairpins at turns 10 and 11 where replaced with a chicane to make a bus stop chicane section helping to make the racing a lot cleaner.

Results

Repeat winners (drivers)

References

 
London
Auto races in the United Kingdom
International sports competitions in London
Recurring sporting events established in 2015
2015 establishments in England